The 1999 Nigerian House of Representatives elections in Nasarawa State was held on February 20, 1999, to elect members of the House of Representatives to represent Nasarawa State, Nigeria.

Overview

Summary

Results

Nasarawa/Toto 
PDP candidate Samuel Egya won the election, defeating other party candidates.

Lafia/Obi 
PDP candidate Yusuf Suleiman won the election, defeating other party candidates.

Keffi/Karu/Kokona  
PDP candidate Salisu M. Raji won the election, defeating other party candidates.

Awe/Doma/Keana 
PDP candidate Musa Elayo won the election, defeating other party candidates.

Akwanga/Nasarawa/Eggon/Wamba 
PDP candidate Idris Yahaya Yakubu won the election, defeating other party candidates.

References 

Nasarawa State House of Representatives elections
February 1999 events in Nigeria
Nasarawa